Elisabeta Palace is a palace on Kiseleff Road in Bucharest, Romania. Built in 1936, it is the official residence in Romania of Margareta of Romania, her husband Prince Radu, and her sister Princess Maria.

The Palace was designed in 1930 by the architect Duiliu Marcu and built in 1936 for Princess Elisabeth, the daughter of King Ferdinand I and his wife Queen Marie, and also the aunt of King Michael I, who was forced to abdicate on 30 December 1947.

In 2001, the Romanian Senate passed a bill which states that the Palace would be awarded to the former king for use as a residence during his lifetime. Since then, members of the former Royal Family have been living there. Foreign heads of state, royalty and politicians are received there, as well as Romanian political, cultural, economic and academic figures when special events are conducted.

History
In July 1935, Princess Elisabeth, former Queen Consort of Greece, divorced her second cousin, the deposed King George II of Greece. After her divorce, she moved to Romania, where she stayed at Banloc Castle.

In 1930, the plans for Elisabeta Palace were made by Romanian architect Duiliu Marcu, who had designed Victoria Palace as well as many other buildings, but all building plans were brought to a halt in the early 1930s due to the Great Depression. Construction finally started in 1936, with the edifice inaugurated in December 1937.

For Elisabeth, the Palace was the achievement of a long elusive dream, heightened during the dearth years spent in Greece. In her memoirs, she wrote: "Perhaps the only thing that I really want is a house of my own something that I can call mine. It has always been my greatest longing since the age of 17. My house to create, to improve, to make perfect and love, offering hospitality to and rejoicing with all those who would love it too. I think the possession of a house would really make me happy. I lived on that hope when I came back to Romania".

The Palace was the official residence of Princess Elisabeth until 1944, when King Michael I performed his coup and overthrew the Nazi-supporting government. After the coup, he left Royal Palace of Bucharest, the official royal residence of the King of Romania, and moved into Elisabeta Palace with his mother to be directly in the centre of the capital; Princess Elisabeth had moved to Copăceni Castle.

On the evening of 30 December 1947, King Michael abdicated. Much later, he claimed that he was forced to do it at gunpoint, with the Palace surrounded by troops from the Tudor Vladimirescu Division, an army unit loyal to the Communists.

Following King Michael's abdication and throughout the period of the "Socialist Republic of Romania", the Palace fell into disuse until 2001, when the former Royal Family returned to Romania after nearly five decades of exile. At that time, they were given official use of the Palace by a bill signed by Traian Băsescu, 4th President of Romania, and approved by the Romanian Senate.

Present
Today Elisabeta Palace is the working residence of Margareta of Romania and Prince Radu. It is also the Headquarters of Her Majesty's Household Association, an NGO recognised by the Government of Romania as 'an Organization of Public Utility' which supports the activities of the Royal Family. Margareta's sisters also carry out engagements from the Elisabeta Palace when in Bucharest.

Margareta and the Royal Family frequently receive cultural and political leaders at the Elisabeta Palace who have included The President of Romania and the Prime Minister among many others. The Royal Family also receive foreign leaders at the Palace as well as hosting receptions, investitures and dinners. An annual Garden Party is given by Margareta in the grounds of the Palace on 10 May to celebrate Monarchy Day. In June 2021 the Royal Family held a Reception to mark 20 years since they returned to the Elisabeta Palace.

From 2020 the Palace was opened to the public on Fridays, Saturdays and Sunday at certain points in the year between April and November for guided tours of the public rooms and grounds.

Image gallery

See also
Romanian Royal Family
Savarsin Castle
Peleş Royal Complex
Peleş Castle
Pelișor Castle

References

External links
 Photo gallery
 Asociaţia Casa Majestăţii Sale Her Majesty's Household Association based at the Elisabeta Palace.
 Online Journal of the Romanian Royal Family Covering events held at the Elisabeta Palace

Royal residences in Romania
Palaces in Bucharest
Buildings and structures in Bucharest
Art Nouveau architecture in Bucharest
Art Nouveau houses